Lowell Otto Miller (June 1, 1889 – March 29, 1962) was a catcher in Major League Baseball from 1910 through 1922 for Brooklyn teams the Superbas (1910, 1913), Dodgers (1911–1912) and Robins (1914–1922).

Career

In a 13-season career, Miller was a .245 hitter (695-for-2836) with five home runs and 231 RBIs in 927 games played, including 229 runs, 97 doubles, 33 triples, and 40 stolen bases. In eight postseason games, he went 3-for-22 for a .136 average.

As a catcher, he collected 3870 outs with 1053 assists and committed 135 errors in 5058 chances for a .973 fielding percentage.

His best season was 1920, when he posted a career-high .289 average and led National League catchers with .986 fielding percentage.

Miller was also a participant in a historical play in the fifth inning of Game 5 of the 1920 World Series. He was tagged by Cleveland Indians second baseman Bill Wambsganss for the third out in the only unassisted triple play in World Series history.

After his playing career ended, Miller managed the Atlanta Crackers in 1923 and was a coach for the Dodgers and Boston Red Sox.

Miller died in Brooklyn at the age of 72, when he fell from a hospital window after cataract surgery.

Postseason appearances
1916 World Series
1920 World Series

See also
List of Major League Baseball players who spent their entire career with one franchise

References

External links
, or Retrosheet

Brooklyn Dodgers players
Brooklyn Robins players
Brooklyn Superbas players
Major League Baseball catchers
Baseball players from Nebraska
1889 births
1962 deaths
Minor league baseball managers
Brooklyn Dodgers coaches
Accidental deaths from falls
Accidental deaths in New York (state)
Sharon Giants players
Duluth White Sox players
Atlanta Crackers managers
Atlanta Crackers players
Indianapolis Indians players
People from Minden, Nebraska